Hungary v England (1954)  was an international football game played on 23 May 1954. The game was played between the Hungary national football team—then the world's number one ranked team and the Olympic champions—and the England national football team, hailing from the birthplace of the game of football and reputed "Kings of Football". The game was a return fixture from the 1953 game in the old Wembley Stadium, where Hungary had beaten England 6–3.

England approached the game in the hope that the 6–3 result had been an aberration; instead, Hungary provided a masterclass of football, and thrashed England 7–1. The match has remained England’s largest defeat to this day.

Background

Under the stewardship of Gusztáv Sebes, Hungary had been unbeaten since May 1950, and had won the 1952 Olympics in Helsinki. They were rated the number one team in the world by FIFA and were firm favourites for the 1954 World Cup.

England were rated the number four team in the world by FIFA, but were still existing in a climate of complacency; the Football Association (FA) saw their country as the originators of the game and assumed English players were technically and physically superior to their foreign counterparts. Coaching and tactical advances from abroad were ignored, with the English national side and the majority of clubs persisting with the outdated WM formation. Manager Walter Winterbottom had no prior managerial experience in professional football, and did not pick the England squad: that role remained with the FA's selection committee, who frequently displayed little or no consistency in their choice of player.

Hungary had visited England in 1953 and delivered a 6–3 thrashing at Wembley—the first time a foreign team outside the British Isles had beaten England on home soil. The result had sent a shockwave through English football, with several prominent managers and players such as Matt Busby, Don Revie, Bill Nicholson and Ron Greenwood realising that the English game had to adapt if the national team was to compete at the highest levels. The FA on the other hand viewed the defeat as a "one-off", and retained Winterbottom and an outdated WM formation for the return game in Budapest.

Date, venue and attendance
The match was played on 23 May 1954 at Nepstadion in Budapest in front of a 92,000 crowd.

The England team 
The England team lined up in its usual WM formation, and included captain Billy Wright, goalkeeper Gil Merrick, winger Tom Finney and inside forward Ivor Broadis. Centre forward Bedford Jezzard was given his debut England cap.

The Hungarian team 
The Hungarian team lined up in the 4–2–4 formation pioneered by their coach, Gusztáv Sebes. József Bozsik played in the deep lying midfield position, with Nándor Hidegkuti free to roam between midfield and attack. Ferenc Puskás and Sándor Kocsis were the strikers, with width being provided by Zoltán Czibor and József Tóth.

First half

Hungary dominated the game; England were unable to obtain the ball for much of the time, and when they did they were unable to make any inroads against a fitter and more tactically adept Hungary side. No lessons had been learnt from the 6–3 defeat at Wembley; England were drawn out of position time and time again. 

Mihály Lantos scored for Hungary after 10 minutes; Ferenc Puskás added a second goal seven minutes later, before Sándor Kocsis made it 3–0 on 19 minutes. England were simply outclassed and outplayed for the rest of the half.

Second half
The second half continued in same vein; Kocsis added his second goal on 57 minutes, Nándor Hidegkuti scored two minutes later, Tóth added a sixth and Puskás scored the final Hungarian goal on the 71st minute. It was a wretched tactical performance by England, with the sole highlight being Ivor Broadis scoring with a hooked shot when the Hungarians were 6–0 up.

The final result was Hungary 7 England 1—this still ranks as England's heaviest footballing defeat.

Long-term influences
The result confirmed what many in the English football world had suspected after the 6–3 defeat at Wembley: that England were no longer a major footballing force, and that the English game needed to look to the continent for tactical and training advances.

Details

See also
 Wolverhampton Wanderers F.C. v Budapest Honvéd FC

References

Hun
1954
1954
Eng
1950s in Budapest
May 1954 sports events in Europe
International sports competitions in Budapest
International association football matches
Hungary–United Kingdom relations

pt:Match of the Century#A Revanche